Un étrange voyage is a 1981 French drama film directed by Alain Cavalier, starring Jean Rochefort and writer/filmmaker Camille de Casabianca. The film won the Prix Louis-Delluc in 1980.

Plot
Pierre, in Paris on his own in his forties and working as a picture restorer, has little contact with his daughter Amélie, a student who he supports, and none with his ex-wife Claire. His closest relationship is with his 80-year-old widowed mother, still active in her house in Troyes, who telephones to say she is taking a train that afternoon to visit him. She is not on the train, nor the next one. In the morning he drives to Troyes and, with a policeman and a locksmith, breaks into the tidy but empty house.

Pierre is convinced that she did take the train as she said and, by accident or malice, fell from it before reaching Paris. Amélie, on vacation after doing well in her exams, agrees with his reasoning and the two get permission from the railway company to search the 150 kilometres of track. For days on end they comb the verges, spending the nights in little rural hotels. They fool around and fight, share each other's thoughts and then part in a rage. Never have the two been so close.

One day, Amélie stumbles on the remains of her grandmother. Knowing now the emotional fragility of her father, she gets him to take her for a good dinner with lots of wine and, once he is relaxed with a pretty young woman, breaks the news to him. The pair have been brought together by tragedy, but will now have to resume their separate lives.

Cast 
Jean Rochefort as Pierre
Camille de Casabianca as Amélie
Arlette Bonnard as Claire
Dominique Besnehard as Marc
Hubert Saint-Macary as The examiner
François Berléand as The rogue witness
Patrick Depeyrrat as The southern teller
Roland Amstutz as The track supervisor
Gérard Chaillou as The SNCF executive
Alain Lachassagne as The locksmith
Patrick Bonnel as The SNCF agent

External links

1981 films
French drama films
1980s French-language films
Films directed by Alain Cavalier
Rail transport films
Louis Delluc Prize winners
1981 drama films
1980s French films